Arzt is a surname of German origin, meaning physician. Notable people with the name include:

 Donna Arzt (1954–2008), American legal scholar
 Eduardo Arzt (born 1953), Argentine molecular biologist
 Leslie Arzt, a fictional character on Lost

 
German-language surnames